Burr Hill is an unincorporated community in Orange County, Virginia, United States. Burr Hill has a post office with ZIP code 22433.

References

Unincorporated communities in Orange County, Virginia
Unincorporated communities in Virginia